Daniel Lee James Curran (born 13 June 1981) is an English former footballer who played as a forward.

Career
Curran began his career at Leyton Orient. On 28 December 1998, after progressing to the first team, Curran made his only Football League appearance in a 1–1 draw away to Darlington in the Third Division. In 2000, Curran signed for Purfleet on loan. After departing Leyton Orient, Curran played for Aveley, East Thurrock United, Chelmsford City and Romford, before signing for Canvey Island in 2006. On 27 January 2011, Curran signed for Tilbury. Curran only played one game for Tilbury, on 29 January 2011, in a 2–1 win against Ilford.

References

1981 births
Living people
Association football forwards
English footballers
People from Brentwood, Essex
Leyton Orient F.C. players
Thurrock F.C. players
Aveley F.C. players
East Thurrock United F.C. players
Chelmsford City F.C. players
Romford F.C. players
Canvey Island F.C. players
Great Wakering Rovers F.C. players
Tilbury F.C. players
English Football League players